Stephen Wochy (né Wojciechowski; December 25, 1922) is a Canadian former professional ice hockey player, who played 54 games for the Detroit Red Wings in the National Hockey League between 1944 and 1946. The rest of his career, which lasted from 1940 to 1955, was spent in the minor leagues. He was born in Fort William, Ontario but has called Sault Ste Marie, Ontario his home since 1954. After Jim Conacher's death in April 2020, he became the oldest living former NHL player. He is the second NHL player known to become a centenarian, Al Suomi being the first known.

Prior to playing in the NHL, Wojciechowski was a member of the Port Arthur Bearcats in 1942 appearing in the 1942 Allan Cup. Wojciechowski played 10 seasons in the American Hockey League after leaving the NHL, with the Indianapolis Capitals, Philadelphia Rockets, Cleveland Barons and Buffalo Bisons. Wojciechowski was named a first team AHL All-star in 1952.

Career statistics

Regular season and playoffs

References

External links
 

1922 births
Living people
Buffalo Bisons (AHL) players
Canadian centenarians
Canadian expatriates in the United States
Canadian ice hockey right wingers
Canadian people of Polish descent
Cleveland Barons (1937–1973) players
Detroit Red Wings players
Ice hockey people from Ontario
Indianapolis Capitals players
Omaha Knights (USHL) players
Ontario Hockey Association Senior A League (1890–1979) players
Philadelphia Rockets players
Sportspeople from Thunder Bay